The Greta River is a river in the Hurunui District of New Zealand. State Highway 1 follows the river for part of its route between Cheviot and Waipara. The locality of Greta Valley is to the east of the Greta River on the banks of the Waikari River. The river was named by local runholders Sir Charles Clifford and Sir Frederick Weld in the 1850s after the Greta River in Yorkshire.

See also
List of rivers of New Zealand

References

Land Information New Zealand - Search for Place Names

Hurunui District
Rivers of Canterbury, New Zealand
Rivers of New Zealand